The 17th Infantry Division is a formation of the Bangladesh Army. It was formed as part of the development vision of Bangladesh Armed Forces Forces Goal 2030. It is located in Sylhet Division.

History

The division was officially formed on 17 September 2013 according to Forces Goal-2030 . Prime Minister Sheikh Hasina formally announced the raising of the division by hoisting the divisional flag  at Jalalabad Cantonment. The division started its journey with the formation of 360 Infantry Brigade and the 32 and 33 Bangladesh Infantry Regiments.

On 23 November 2016, the Prime Minister laid the foundation stones of eight projects, including the division headquarters, at the Sylhet Cantonment. A flag-raising ceremony of nine units, including a newly formed brigade was also held.

Formation
Under the division there are 3 new infantry brigades, 8 infantry regiments, 1 artillery brigade, 3 artillery regiment and 7 other various units. Major General Chowdhury Mohammad Azizul Haque Hazary is the current commander of the division. One of the previous commanders, Major General Jubayer Salehin, who also served as Sylhet Area as its Area Commander became the Commandant of the Defence Services Command and Staff College (DSCSC).

Combat Arms

 Regiment of Artillery
 17 Artillery Brigade
 18 Field Regiment Artillery 
 22 Field Regiment Artillery 
 50 Field Regiment Artillery
 Infantry:
 11 Infantry Brigade (Sylhet cantonment, raised in 2016)
 360 Infantry Brigade
 52 Infantry Brigade
 6 Bangladesh Infantry Regiment (BIR)
 34 Bangladesh Infantry Regiment (BIR)
 42 Bangladesh Infantry Regiment (BIR)
 13 East Bengal Regiment (EBR or simply East Bengal)
 38 East Bengal Regiment (EBR or simply East Bengal)
 61 East Bengal Regiment (EBR or simply East Bengal) (Rear)
 64 East Bengal Regiment (EBR or simply East Bengal)
 65 East Bengal Regiment (EBR or simply East Bengal)

Combat support
 Corps of Engineers
21 Engineer Battalion
 Military intelligence
 598 Field Intelligence Unit (FIU)
 Corps of Signals (Sig)
 8 Signal Battalion

Combat service support
 Corps of Military Police (CMP)
 17 military police (MP)
 Army Services Corps (ASC)
 38 Supply and Transport Battalion
 Ordnance Corps
 508 Division Ordnance Company
 Army Medical Corps (AMC)
 91 field ambulance

References

Infantry divisions of Bangladesh
Military units and formations established in 2013